Kieran Wright may refer to:

 Kieran Wright (artist), New Zealand-born American artist
 Kieran Wright (footballer), Scottish footballer